Lyons Hall may refer to:
 
Lyons Hall, Essex, a historic manor in Essex
Lyons Hall (University of Notre Dame), a residence hall at the University of Notre Dame

See also
Lyonshall
Lyon Hall (disambiguation)